The Andrew Young House is a historic house in Astoria, Oregon, United States.

It was listed on the National Register of Historic Places in 1986.

See also
National Register of Historic Places listings in Clatsop County, Oregon

References

External links

1875 establishments in Oregon
Gothic Revival architecture in Oregon
Houses completed in 1875
Houses on the National Register of Historic Places in Astoria, Oregon